Półwieś may refer to the following places:
Półwieś, Lesser Poland Voivodeship (south Poland)
Półwieś, Pomeranian Voivodeship (north Poland)
Półwieś, Warmian-Masurian Voivodeship (north Poland)